The Tornedalians are descendants of Finns who, at some point, settled to the areas of today's Northern Sweden near the Torne Valley district and west from there.

History
Tornedalians migrated from today's Southern Finland, mainly from Häme and Karelia. Settlement began around the northern end of the Gulf of Bothnia and along the river valleys nearby (Kalix River, Torne River, and Kemijoki River). Migration started at the latest over 2000 years ago on areas loosely controlled by Russians and Karelians.

Population
Sweden does not distinguish minority groups in population censuses, but the number of people who identify themselves as Tornedalians is usually estimated to be between 30,000 and 150,000.  Estimates are complicated by the fact that the remote and sparsely-populated Tornedalen area has been particularly struck by the twentieth century urbanization and unemployment.  In 2006, a large radio survey about Finnish/Meänkieli speakers was conducted in Sweden. The result was that 469,000 individuals in Sweden claim to understand/speak Finnish or/and Meänkieli. Those who can speak/understand Meänkieli is estimated to be 150,000–175,000.

Literature
Bengt Pohjanen is a Tornedalian author who has written the first novel in Meänkieli, the language of the Meänmaa. He has written dramas, screenplays, songs and opera. He is trilingual in his writing.

The novel Populärmusik från Vittula (Popular Music from Vittula) (2000) by Tornedalian author Mikael Niemi became very popular both in Sweden and in Finland.  The novel is composed of colourful stories of everyday life in the Tornedalian town of Pajala. The novel has been adapted for several stage productions, and as a film in 2004.

Flag 
The flag is a horizontal tricolor of yellow, white and blue.

See also
Sami
Kola Norwegians
Tornio, Finland

References

 
Ethnic groups in Sweden
Ethnic groups in Sápmi
Baltic Finns